Teter may refer to:

People
 Earl Lucky Teter (1901–1942), American stunt driver and promoter
 F. B. Teter (1873–1922), American politician
 Hannah Teter (born 1987), American snowboarder
 Nicole Teter (born 1973), American middle distance runner

Geography
 Teter, West Virginia, United States, an unincorporated community
 Teter Creek, West Virginia

See also
 Teter Myers French House, Hedgesville, West Virginia, a mansion built by Teter French in 1860, on the National Register of Historic Places
 Charlene Teters (born 1952), Native American artist, educator and lecturer